The ACBL Youngest Life Master is a record set by the youngest person to achieve the American Contract Bridge League (ACBL) rank of Life Master. The requirements of this rank have been raised several times.

Records

References

Contract bridge in the United States